Perry Wilbon Howard may be:

Perry Howard, nineteenth-century Mississippi politician
Perry Wilbon Howard II, twentieth-century lawyer, son of Perry Howard